Clara Campoamor, la mujer olvidada is a Spanish period drama television film directed by Laura Mañá. Focused on the figure of Clara Campoamor, it stars Elvira Mínguez in the leading role. It originally aired on La 1 on 9 March 2011.

Premise 
Set in the Second Spanish Republic, the fiction follows Clara Campoamor's struggle for women's active suffrage in the parliamentary meetings of the Cortes, where she convinced the majority of the house of her cause.

Cast 
 Elvira Mínguez as Clara Campoamor.
 Antonio de la Torre as Antonio García.
 Mónica López as Victoria Kent.
 Joan Carrera as José Álvarez-Buylla.
  as Indalecio Prieto.
 Jordi Sánchez as José María Gil-Robles.
  as Manuel Azaña.
  as Alejandro Lerroux
  as Alcalá Zamora.
 Montserrat Carulla as Pilar.
 Roger Casamajor as Ignacio.
 Sara Espígul as Lola.

Production and release 
Jointly produced by Distinto Films, Televisió de Catalunya and Televisión Española, the film was directed by Laura Mañá, whereas the screenplay was authored by Yolanda García Serrano and Rafa Russo. While chiefly set in Madrid, scenes set in the interior of the Palacio de las Cortes were actually shot in the seat of the Parliament of Catalonia in Barcelona. Filming ended in late 2010 in Madrid with an outdoor scene shot at the entrance of the Palacio de las Cortes.

It premiered in prime time on 9 March 2011 on La 1, earning 2,634,000 viewers and a 13.3% audience share. It re-aired on La 1, TV3 and La 2.

Awards and nominations 

|-
| align = "center" | 2011 || Prix Europa || colspan = "2" | Best TV Fiction ||  || 
|-
| align = "center" | 2012 || 4th Gaudí Awards || colspan = "2" | Best TV Movie ||  || 
|}

References 

Films set in the 1930s
Spanish television films
2011 in Spanish television
Spanish-language television shows
Spanish historical drama films
2010s historical drama films
2011 television films
Films set in Madrid
Films shot in Barcelona
Films shot in Madrid
La 1 (Spanish TV channel) original programming